Elgonima is a genus of thrips in the family Phlaeothripidae. It has a single species, 
Elgonima seticeps.

References

Phlaeothripidae
Thrips
Thrips genera
Monotypic insect genera